Qaleh-ye Abbasabad (also Romanized as Qal‘eh-ye ‘Abbāsābād; also known as ‘Abbasābād and ‘Abbāsābād) is a village in Sang Sefid Rural District, Qareh Chay District, Khondab County, Markazi Province, Iran. At the 2006 census, its population was 274, in 57 families.

References 

Populated places in Khondab County